The A 19 road is an A-Grade trunk road 
in Sri Lanka. It connects Polgahawela with Kegalle.

References

Highways in Sri Lanka